Steve Burke or Stephen Burke may refer to:

Steve Burke (baseball) (born 1955), former Major League Baseball pitcher
Steve Burke (businessman) (born 1958), Chairman of NBCUniversal
Steve Burke (footballer) (born 1960), English former footballer
Steve Burke (composer) (born 1974), British video game composer, sound designer and voice actor
Steve Burke (One Life to Live), a soap opera character

See also
Steven Burke (born 1988), English track and road cyclist